Les Ogres de Barback (sometimes known just as Les Ogres) is a French musical group formed in 1994 by two brothers and two sisters: Fred, Sam, and the twins Alice and Mathilde Burguière. They all are multi-instrumentalists, have various influences and collaborated many times with other artists. They are known for the high quality of their work (both technically and lyricwise) as well as for the rich variety of instruments in their works.

Members
All family (and band) members were born in Jouy-le-Moutier in the Val-d'Oise department of France. Their parents are of Armenian origin. The members are: 
Fred Burguière - Chromatic button accordion, diatonic button accordion, trombone, guitar, cornet, double bass, bass drum, main vocals
Sam Burguière - violin, trumpet, guitar, flugelhorn, Epinette des Vosges, accordion
Alice Burguière - cello, double bass, trombone, guitar, accordion, tuba, erhu, musical saw, violin, backing vocals
Mathilde Burguière - piano, tuba, Western concert flute, clarinet, guitar, accordion, sousaphone, percussions, cello, backing vocals

Discography

Albums

Live albums

Compilation albums

Singles

Collaborations
1998: K2R Riddim - Carnet de Roots
2001: K2R Riddim - Decaphonik
2001: Debout sur le Zinc - L'Hômme à tue-tête
2001: Les Hurlements d'Léo - La belle affaire
2002: Pierre Perret - Cui là
2003: Les Hurlements d'Léo - Ouest Terne
2005: Tryo - Tryo au Cabaret Sauvage
2006: L'Air de rien - Luttopie
2007: Jules - Les années douces
2008: Les Barbeaux - Les Saints Ecrits
2008: Aldebert - Enfantillages
2009: Syrano - Le Gout du Sans
2010: L'Air de rien - La route du rom
2010: La Mine de Rien - La tête allant vers
2012: La Mine de Rien - Live
2014: Txarango - Som un riu

References

External links
Les Ogres de Barback Official website 
Irfan (le label) Official website

Musical groups from Île-de-France
Sibling musical groups
Musical groups established in 1994